Romula or Malva was an ancient city in Roman Dacia, later the village of Reşca, Dobrosloveni Commune, Olt County, Romania.  It was the capital of Dacia Malvensis, one of the three subdivisions of the province of Dacia.

History 

The Roman city of Romula lay on an earlier Dacian settlement called Malva. It received the title of municipium during the rule of Hadrian (117–138) and the title of colonia during that of Septimius Severus (193–211).

The city had two belts of fortifications and two castra, where soldiers of the Legiones VII Claudia and XXII Primigenia were temporarily stationed, alongside a permanent unit (numerus) of Syrian archers.

See also 
 Dacian davae
 List of ancient cities in Thrace and Dacia
 Dacia
 Roman Dacia

References

Ancient

Modern 

 
 Dicţionar de istorie veche a României ("Dictionary of ancient Romanian history") (1976) Editura Ştiinţifică şi Enciclopedică, pp. 510

Further reading 

 
 Tătulea, Corneliu Mărgărit. Romula-Malva. Monografie. București, Ed. Museion, 1994, 176 p.

External links 
Roman castra from Romania – Google Maps / Earth

Dacian towns
Archaeological sites in Romania
Ruins in Romania
Coloniae (Roman)